Transposition may refer to:

Logic and mathematics 
 Transposition (mathematics), a permutation which exchanges two elements and keeps all others fixed
 Transposition, producing the transpose of a matrix AT, which is computed by swapping columns for rows in the matrix A
 Transpose of a linear map
 Transposition (logic), a rule of replacement in philosophical logic
 Transpose relation, another name for converse relation

Games 
 Transposition (chess), different moves or a different move order leading to the same position, especially during the openings
 Transposition table, used in computer games to speed up the search of the game tree

Biology 
 Transposition (birth defect), a group of congenital defects involving an abnormal spatial arrangement of tissue or organ
 Transposition of the great vessels, cardiac transposition, a congenital heart defect with malformation of any of the major vessels
 Transposition of teeth
 Penoscrotal transposition
 Transposition (horizontal gene transfer), the transfer of genetic material between organisms other than by vertical gene transfer
 Transposons, or genetic transposition, a mutation in which a chromosomal segment is transferred to a new position on the same or another chromosome

Other uses 
 Transposition (law), the incorporation of the provisions of a European Union directive into a Member State's  domestic law
 Transposition (music), moving a note or collection of notes up or down in pitch by a constant number of semitones
 Transposition (transmission lines), periodic swapping of positions of the conductors of a transmission line
 Transposition cipher, an elementary cryptographic operation
 Transposition, docking, and extraction an orbital maneuver performed on the Apollo lunar missions
 Transposition,  sleight of hand (magic), a performer appears to make two different objects ([usually] coins or cards) switch places with one another faster than physically possible.
Transpose, a database of academic journal preprinting policies maintained by ASAPbio